David H. Ponitz Career Technology Center is a technical school located in downtown Dayton, Ohio. Ponitz enrolls 800 students in grades 9-12 annually. Ponitz is also part of the Dayton Public School District.

School information
Ponitz Career Technology Center was built in 2009 and serves as the city of Dayton's second career center. Ponitz offers career-technical certificates in:

 Arts and Communication including Radio/TV, Sports Marketing, Graphic Design, and Multimedia
 Business and Information Technology including Management, Finance, Networking, Programming, and Cosmetology
 Health and Education including Dental Assisting, Allied Health, Biotechnology, Public Safety, and STEM Academy
 Industrial and Engineering Systems including Construction, Engineering, and Automotive

Ponitz is also in a strong partnership with Sinclair Community College. Upon completion of their career community programs students are eligible for a $3000 scholarship to use for tuition, books and fees at Sinclair Community College. As well as college credits that were earned while in high school. Because Ponitz is a Career Center and not a typical high school, there can be a different experience than that associated with high schools. But with sports, and music the high school experience is still available.

The district-owned FM radio station WDPS broadcasts from studios at Ponitz Career Technology Center.

See also
 Dayton Public School District

References

External links
 Official website

Education in Dayton, Ohio
School districts in Ohio
2009 establishments in Ohio